The DD Form 214, Certificate of Release or Discharge from Active Duty, generally referred to as a "DD 214", is a document of the United States Department of Defense, issued upon a military service member's retirement, separation, or discharge from active duty in the Armed Forces of the United States (i.e., U.S. Army, U.S. Navy, U.S. Marine Corps, U.S. Air Force, U.S. Space Force, U.S. Coast Guard).

History and usage
The first DD Form 214s were issued in 1950, replacing the older "WD AGO" (War Department Adjutant General's Office) Forms and the NAVPERS (Naval Personnel) discharge documents. These documents had existed since 1941. In earlier versions of the form (1 November 1972) it was called a "Report of Separation from Active Duty"; the current title dates from 1 July 1979.

DD Form 214 is the capstone documentation of completed military service, representing the complete, verified record of a service member's time in the military (Active, including Reservists on active assignments).  Among the most important details is the character of service  (Honorable, Dishonorable, General Under Honorable Conditions, etc.),  which greatly affects veteran benefits and can have long-term reputational impact.  Other important data includes the servicemember's awards and medals, highest rank/rate and pay grade held on active duty, lengths of service  (including total time, sea time, overseas service, and prior service periods),  job specialty, and a record of training and schools completed.  Job specialty documents primary and secondary qualifications, such as Military Occupational Specialty (MOS), Air Force Specialty Code (AFSC), Navy Enlisted Classification (NEC), Navy officer designator, Navy Officer Billet Code (NOBC), and Navy Additional Qualification Designation (AQD).  Individuals who served exclusively in the Air National Guard or Army National Guard  (with no periods activated to regular service components)  do not receive a DD Form 214, but will receive a form called NGB-22 from the National Guard Bureau.

The DD Form 214 is commonly used by various government agencies, chief among them the Department of Veterans Affairs, to evaluate eligibility for veteran benefits, and it may be requested by employers  (to evaluate experience, skills, and character, as well as to verify eligibility for preferential hiring where applicable).

This document also contains codes used by the Armed Forces to describe a former servicemember's reason for discharge and, in the case of enlisted personnel, their reenlistment eligibility. These codes are known as Separation Designator/Separation Justification (abbreviated as SPD/SJC) Codes and Reenlistment Eligibility (RE) Codes, respectively.

DD Form 214 is also generally required by funeral directors for immediate proof of eligibility for interment in a VA cemetery, to obtain a grave marker, or to provide military honors to a deceased veteran. On September 1, 2000, the National Defense Authorization Act enabled, upon the family's request, every eligible veteran to receive a military funeral honors ceremony to include the folding and presentation of the United States burial flag and the sounding of Taps at no cost to the family.

Copies of DD Form 214 are typically maintained by the government as part of a service member's 201 file or OMPF (Official Military Personnel File). The 201 file generally contains additional personnel-related forms.

Available versions
There are two versions of the DD Form 214, usually referred to simply as "short" or "redacted" or "deleted" (edited), and "long" or "unredacted" or "undeleted" (unedited) copies. The edited, or "short", copy omits a great deal of information, chiefly the Characterization of Service, Reason for Separation, and Authority for Separation.

Copies
Service members are given the option of accepting the "short form" edited Member 1, "long form" unedited Member 4 or both copies upon separation.  

The most important copy of the DD 214 for the individual is the long form copy. It is the standard form needed to obtain benefits such as GI Bill or government employment priority.

There are eight original DD214 copies. All but Member 1, the "short form" copy, contain information as to the nature and type of discharge, and the re-enlistment code. This code is used to determine whether or not the service member can go back into the service. For unemployment benefits, veterans affairs benefits, as well as for several other services, the "Member's Copy 4" is usually requested but any other "long form" copy is acceptable. All eight copies are identical except Member 1, the "short form," which lacks this critical information. The military will not provide a replacement "Member's Copy 4" (it is the service member's personal copy and physically given to him at separation) and any request for a replacement is always honored by providing a "Service 2", "Service 7" or "Service 8" copy. All but Member 1 are acceptable legal substitutes for Member 4.

Other versions of the DD Form 214 include the "Member 1" (deleted version), "Service 7 & 8" (additional copies of the "Service 2"), "Veterans Affairs 3" (sent directly to the Department of Veterans Affairs), "Member 6" (provided to the respective veteran's State Department of Veteran Affairs), and "Department of Labor 5" (provided directly to the United States Department of Labor).

If for whatever reason an original DD214 is unusable, unreadable, or destroyed, upon verification of service, the National Personnel Record Center can issue NA Form 13038, a Certification of Military Service, which is also a perfect legal substitute for DD214.

Electronic Cost-Free Copy of DD 214
eBenefits, a web portal managed jointly by the United States Department of Veterans Affairs (VA) and the United States Department of Defense (DoD) provides Service members with free electronic copies of their Official Military Personnel File, including their DD Form 214. Electronic copies will be provided within 42 hours from the time of request. In order for a service member to request a DD 214 in eBenefits, they must have an eBenefits Premium Account ( DS Logon Level 2).

Paper Cost-Free Copy of DD 214
The National Personnel Records Center is the government agency tasked with replacing lost and destroyed DD Form 214s upon request from a veteran. Requested copies are mailed from the Military Personnel Records Center. Most veterans who separated from their service generally pre-1992 can obtain their DD 214 from the National Personnel Records Center, ("NPRC"). The NPRC has two distinct tracks available to obtain records for veterans. The first is for the veteran to submit a Department of Defense Standard Form 180 ("SF180") to the facility via mail or fax. The second is to appear in-person at the facility. The National Archives also maintains a list of independent researchers who will physically visit the St. Louis facility to request records in person.

Corrections
The DD Form 215 ("Correction to DD Form 214, Certificate of Release or Discharge from Active Duty") is used for additions or error corrections to a DD Form 214.  It is distributed in the same manner as the DD Form 214.

Distribution
A DD Form 214/215 is prepared in eight copies and distributed as follows:
 Copy 1 – Service Member
 Copy 2 – Service Personnel File
 Copy 3 – United States Department of Veterans Affairs
 Copy 4 – Member (if initialed in Block 30)
 Copy 5 – United States Department of Labor
 Copy 6 – State Director of Veteran Affairs
 Copy 7 & 8 – Distributed in accordance with Military Service Department directions (shredded and retain)

See also
Military discharge

References

External links
How to get copies of Military Service Records (e.g.,: DD 214/DD 215) - National Archives
eBenefits Homepage
Army Regulation 635-5 Separation Documents
National Personnel Records Center

United States Department of Defense
United States government forms
United States military pay and benefits